Lotos may refer to:

 Grupa Lotos, oil company
 Lotos Kolej, railway company
 LOTOS Goldbrillen GmbH, a German luxury eyewear company founded in 1872
 Lotos (satellite), a Russian family of electronic intelligence satellites
 Language Of Temporal Ordering Specification
 The Lotos-Eaters, a poem by Alfred Tennyson

See also 
 Lotus (disambiguation)